The list of shipwrecks in May 1829 includes some ships sunk, wrecked or otherwise lost during May 1829.

1 May

3 May

6 May

7 May

8 May

10 May

11 May

13 May

16 May

18 May

21 May

22 May

25 May

27 May

31 May

Unknown date

References

1829-05